Beiyuan Subdistrict is a subdistrict of Beijing and is located in Tongzhou District. It covers an area of 8.7 square kilometers and is home to 108,840 residents as of 2020. Its floating population is estimated to be 6 million.

The subdistrict took its name from a corrupted form of Beiyuan, an estate owned by Qing dynasty officials in charge of transporting grains through the Grand Canal.

History 

 1948: 4 townships of Tongxian were combined into Tongzhou City
 1950: Tongzhou City became a county-administered town
 1997: Tongzhou Town was disbanded, and Xicheng Subdistrict was incorporated into Beiyuan Subdistrict.

Administrative divisions 
As of 2021, the subdistrict is divided into the following 13 communities:

Transportation
Beijing Bus lines 415,426, 430, 464, 466, 479, 484, 558, 569, 596, 617, 620, 629, 653, 695, 751, 758, 984, 985, Yuntong 117, T11 and Night 215 have stops within Beiyuan. Most of these lines can be taken to get from or to Beijing city proper.

Gallery

See also
List of township-level divisions of Beijing

References

External links
Official Chinese webpage 

Tongzhou District, Beijing
Subdistricts of Beijing